Ab Bahar-e Do (also Romanized as Āb Bahār-e Do; also known as Ābahār, Āb Bahār, and Āb-e Bahār) is a village in Jahangiri Rural District, in the Central District of Masjed Soleyman County, Khuzestan Province, Iran. At the 2006 census, its population was 54, in 13 families.

References 

Populated places in Masjed Soleyman County